The 1955 NAIA basketball tournament was held in March at Municipal Auditorium in Kansas City, Missouri. The 18th annual NAIA basketball tournament featured 32 teams playing in a single-elimination format.

The 1955 tournament featured four of the all-time leading scorers, two single-game best tournament performances, and most free throws made in tournament history.

The championship game featured East Texas State (now Texas A&M-Commerce) and Southeastern Oklahoma State. East Texas State defeated SEOSU, 71–54. The other teams in the NAIA Semifinals were Western Illinois State and Arkansas Tech. The Leathernecks defeated the Wonder Boys for the third place title, 77–74.

Awards and honors
Many of the records set by the 1955 tournament have been broken, and many of the awards were established much later:
Leading scorer est. 1963
Leading rebounder est. 1963
Charles Stevenson Hustle Award est. 1958
Player of the Year est. 1994
Most free throws made; single game: 24 free throws made by Joe Miller of Alderson-Broaddus (W.Va.) in a game verses Quincy (Ill.).
Most free throws made; career: 120 free throws made by Jim Spivey of Southeastern Oklahoma State (1954,55,56,57).
All-time single game performances: 5th Joe Miller of Alderson-Broaddus (W.Va.) vs. Quincy (Ill.). Miller scored 12 field goals and  24 free throws, totaling 48 points.
All-time single game performances: 12th Paul Brownlee of Steubenville (Ohio) vs. Southeastern Oklahoma. Brownlee scored 16 field goals and 14 free throws, totaling 46 points.
All-time scoring leader; first appearance: Bennie Swain 6th, Texas Southern (1955,56,57,58), 15 games, 119 field goals, 64 free throws, totaling 302 points, 20.1 average per game.
All-time scoring leader; second appearance: James Spivey, 4th Southeastern Oklahoma State (1954,55,56,57), 13 games, 133 field goals, 120 free throws, totaling 386 points, 29.7 average per game.
All-time scoring leaders; final appearance: E.C. O’Neal, 9th, Arkansas Tech (1952,53,54,55), 13 games, 122 field goals, 43 free throws, totaling 287 points, 22.1 average per game; James Miller, 18th, East Texas State (1953,54,55), 13 games, 103 field goals, 40 free throws, totaling 246 points, 18.9 average per game.

Bracket

  * denotes overtime.

See also
 1955 NCAA basketball tournament
 1955 National Invitation Tournament

References

NAIA Men's Basketball Championship
Tournament
NAIA men's basketball tournament
NAIA men's basketball tournament